= Mr. Dinkles =

American punk rock band

- Origin: Seattle, Washington, U.S.
- Genres: Punk rock; Garage punk
- Years active: 2019–present
- Label: Futureless
- Members: MacLeighin Rettig; Rocco Ramos
- Past members: Gretchen Elliot

Mr. Dinkles is an American punk rock band formed in 2019 in Seattle, Washington.

== History ==
The band was formed in 2019 by lead vocalist and guitarist MacLeighin Rettig and drummer Gretchen Elliot.

Mr. Dinkles released their debut EP Self Titled on March 13, 2020.

Later in 2020, the band's debut album Titled Self was released on October 31.

Their second album What Happens When You Smoke Dr Ug was released on October 1, 2022.

In 2025, drummer Gretchen Elliot left the band and was replaced by Rocco Ramos.

On January 16, 2026, the single "Eat Chips and Talk Shit" was released.

The single "IDRW" was released on February 27, 2026. "IDRW" was the last song released to be recorded with original drummer Gretchen Elliot.

"Letter to Elon" was released as a single on April 17, 2026. This was the first song released to be recorded with drummer Rocco Ramos. "Letter to Elon" is a protest song written about Elon Musk and compassion for others.

The single "Socialism Ditty" was released on May 15, 2026.

Their second EP R.I.P.T. was released on June 5, 2026, by Futureless Records. At least twelve songs were recorded during the sessions for the R.I.P.T. EP. Four out of five songs on R.I.P.T. were released as singles.

The single "Brain" was released on October 30, 2026. "Brain" is the first single from the upcoming REZN EP. REZN will include five tracks.

== Members ==
Current members

- MacLeighin Rettig – lead vocals, guitar (2019–present)
- Rocco Ramos – drums, backing vocals (2025–present)

Former members

- Gretchen Elliot – drums, backing vocals (2019–2025)

Timeline

== Discography ==
=== Studio albums ===
- Titled Self (October 31, 2020)
- What Happens When You Smoke Dr Ug (October 1, 2022)

=== EPs ===
- Self Titled (March 13, 2020)
- R.I.P.T. (June 5, 2026) (Futureless)

=== Singles ===
Title	Release date		Album
"Eat Chips and Talk Shit" (Futureless)	January 16	2026	R.I.P.T.
"IDRW" (Futureless)	February 27	2026	R.I.P.T.
"Letter to Elon" (Futureless)	April 17	2026	R.I.P.T.
"Socialism Ditty" (Futureless)	May 15	2026	R.I.P.T.
"Brain" (Futureless)	October 30	2026	REZN
