= R.I.P.T. =

EP by Mr. Dinkles
- Released: June 5, 2026
- Genres: Punk rock; garage punk
- Length: 12:49
- Label: Futureless
- Producer: Robert Adam Stevenson

Mr. Dinkles chronology
What Happens When You Smoke Dr Ug (2022)	R.I.P.T. (2026)	REZN (2027)

Singles from R.I.P.T.
- 1. "Eat Chips and Talk Shit" Released: January 16, 2026; 2. "IDRW" Released: February 27, 2026; 3. "Letter to Elon" Released: April 17, 2026; 4. "Socialism Ditty" Released: May 15, 2026

R.I.P.T. is the second EP released by the punk rock band Mr. Dinkles. The EP was released on June 5, 2026. It includes the last songs featuring original drummer Gretchen Elliot, who played on "Eat Chips and Talk Shit" and "IDRW." R.I.P.T. is also the first release of multiple songs to be recorded with drummer Rocco Ramos, who played on the remaining three songs. The album was released by Futureless Records. A minimum of twelve songs were recorded during the sessions.

"Letter to Elon" is a protest song written about Elon Musk and compassion for others.

== Track listing ==
All tracks are written by MacLeighin Rettig, Rocco Ramos, and Robert Adam Stevenson, except "Eat Chips and Talk Shit" and "IDRW" (Rettig, Gretchen Elliot, Stevenson).

No.	Title	Length
1.	"Socialism Ditty"	2:38
2.	"Eat Chips and Talk Shit"	2:03
3.	"Letter to Elon"	2:46
4.	"Grinding My Teeth"	3:10
5.	"IDRW"	2:12
Total length:		12:49

== Personnel ==
Mr. Dinkles

- MacLeighin Rettig – lead vocals, guitar
- Rocco Ramos – drums and backing vocals on all tracks except "Eat Chips and Talk Shit" and "IDRW"
- Gretchen Elliot – drums on "Eat Chips and Talk Shit" and IDRW"

Technical

- Robert Adam Stevenson – production
